This article lists the squads lists for badminton's 2023 Badminton Asia Mixed Team Championships. Rankings stated are per tournament prospectus based on BWF World Ranking for 31 January 2023.

Group A
Group A consists of China, South Korea, Singapore and Uzbekistan.

China

South Korea

Singapore

Uzbekistan

Group B
Group B consists of Malaysia, India, Kazakhstan and the United Arab Emirates.

Malaysia

India

Kazakhstan

United Arab Emirates

Group C
Group C consists of Indonesia, Thailand, Bahrain, Syria and Lebanon.

Indonesia

Thailand

Bahrain

Syria

Lebanon

Group D
Group D consists of Japan, Chinese Taipei, Hong Kong and Pakistan.

Japan

Chinese Taipei

Hong Kong

Pakistan

References

2023 Badminton Asia Mixed Team Championships